The Cochiquito Volcanic Group is a small volcanic group of volcanoes north of the town of Buta Ranquil in Argentina.  The main peak is Volcán Cochiquito, a stratovolcano of estimated Pleistocene–Holocene age.  There are eight satellite cones in the volcanic field, including Volcán Sillanegra (a pyroclastic cone complex) and Volcán Ranquil del Sur (a small stratovolcano).

See also
List of volcanoes in Argentina

Sources
 

Stratovolcanoes of Argentina
Andean Volcanic Belt
Volcanic groups
Subduction volcanoes
Mountains of Argentina
Pleistocene stratovolcanoes